HD 4778, also known as HR 234 and GO Andromedae, is a variable star in the constellation Andromeda. Its magnitude varies by 0.04 magnitudes from the median of 6.12 with a period of approximately 2.55 days.

This is an Ap star with a stellar classification of A3VpSiSrCrEuKsn, showing chemical peculiarities in its spectrum from strontium, chromium, and europium. It is an Alpha2 Canum Venaticorum variable with a magnetic field that varies across the range . This rotation-modulated variability allows direct determination of the rotation rate of 2.5616 days.

HD 4778 has 2.24 times the mass of the Sun and 2.36 times the Sun's radius. The star is radiating 35 times the Sun's luminosity from its photosphere at an effective temperature of 9,375 K. It is about 77 million years old.

References

Ap stars
Alpha2 Canum Venaticorum variables
Andromeda (constellation)
Durchmusterung objects
004778
0234
003919
Andromedae, GO